The 1975–76 Cypriot Cup was the 34th edition of the Cypriot Cup. A total of 35 clubs entered the competition. It began on 8 May 1976 with the preliminary round and concluded on 27 June 1976 with the final which was held at Tsirio Stadium. APOEL won their 9th Cypriot Cup trophy after beating Alki Larnaca 6–0 in the final.

Format 
In the 1975–76 Cypriot Cup, participated all the teams of the Cypriot First Division, the Cypriot Second Division and the Cypriot Third Division.

The competition consisted of six knock-out rounds. In all rounds each tie was played as a single leg and was held at the home ground of the one of the two teams, according to the draw results. Each tie winner was qualifying to the next round. If a match was drawn, extra time was following. If extra time was drawn, there was a replay at the ground of the team who were away for the first game. If the rematch was also drawn, then extra time was following and if the match remained drawn after extra time the winner was decided by penalty shoot-out.

The cup winner secured a place in the 1976–77 European Cup Winners' Cup.

Preliminary round 
In the preliminary round 2 teams of each category participated. The teams were decided by drawing. Achilleas Kaimakli, a team of 1975–76 Cypriot Third Division did't want to participate in the 1975–76 Cyprus Cup, so only 7 of the 8 teams of the 1975–76 Cypriot Third Division participated.

First round 
8 clubs from the 1976–77 Cypriot First Division, 7 clubs from the 1976–77 Cypriot Second Division and 7 clubs from the 1976–77 Cypriot Third Division were added.

Second round

Quarter-finals

Semi-finals

Final

Sources

Bibliography

See also 
 Cypriot Cup
 1975–76 Cypriot First Division

Cypriot Cup seasons
1975–76 domestic association football cups
1975–76 in Cypriot football